The 2012 Bolivarian Beach Games, officially the I Bolivarian Beach Games, is an international multi-sport event that is being held from November 1–11, 2012 in Lima, Peru. With approximately 1,500 athletes from 10 nations participating in 15 sports. The Bolivarian Beach are organized by the ODEBO, the Bolivarian Sports Organization.

The 2012 Bolivarian Beach Games saw the participation of Chile for the first time as a Bolivarian team, Chile had joined ODEBO not long before the games. The event also was the first time ODEBO invited not-bolivarian countries to join the 7 registered countries.

The Games

Opening ceremony
The opening ceremony of the games took place on November 1, 2012, at 8:00 pm Peruvian Standard Time (-05:00 UTC) at Manuel Bonilla Stadium.

Participating teams
All 6 members of ODEBO competed at the Games plus the 4 invited members from PASO for a total of 10 countries.

ODEBO Members
 
 
 
 
  (Host)
 

Invited nations

Sports

 
 
 
 
 
 
 
 
 
 Subaquatic
 
 Open water swimming with swimfins (2) (details)

Calendar

Medal table
Final medal tally

Medal table reflecting the final results as of November 11, 2012.

References

External links
 Official website

 
Beach
Bolivarian Beach Games
Bolivarian Beach Games
Multi-sport events in Peru
International sports competitions hosted by Peru
Bolivarian Beach Games
Sports competitions in Lima
Bolivarian Beach Games